Kingfish is an American rock band led by Matthew Kelly, a musician, singer, and songwriter who plays guitar and harmonica.  Kelly co-founded Kingfish in 1973 with New Riders of the Purple Sage bass player Dave Torbert and fellow San Francisco Bay Area musicians Robbie Hoddinott (lead guitar), Chris Herold (drums), and Mick Ward (keyboards). Ward died in a car accident later that year, and was replaced by Barry Flast, another keyboardist from San Francisco.

In 1974, Kingfish became more well known, and signed their first record contract, after Grateful Dead guitarist and singer Bob Weir, a long-time friend of Kelly's, joined the band.  (Kelly had previously been a guest musician on the Grateful Dead album Wake of the Flood.)  Weir toured with Kingfish and was a band member on their first two albums, Kingfish and Live 'n' Kickin'.  When the Dead started touring again in 1976, Weir left Kingfish, along with Hoddinott and Herold, who were then replaced by Michael O'Neill (lead guitar) and David Perper (drums).  (Kelly later appeared on the Grateful Dead albums Shakedown Street and The Closing of Winterland, and on Weir's album Bobby and the Midnites.  In 1995 he became a founding member of Weir's band Ratdog.)

The lineup of the band continued to change, with Kelly and Torbert remaining at the core.  Then, in 1979 Torbert and Kelly parted ways and Torbert formed a new lineup with Danny "Rio" DeGennaro and Michael O'Neill on guitars and sharing lead vocals. Also part of that lineup were Steve Shive (drums) and Ralph Liberto (keyboards, saxophone). Dave Torbert died of a heart attack in 1982.

Starting in 1984, Kingfish would regroup from time to time and go on tour with a gradually evolving lineup of musicians led by Matthew Kelly.  In 1987, Kelly also released a solo album called A Wing and a Prayer.

In 1999 Kingfish released a new studio album, Sundown on the Forest, recorded over a period of several years with different combinations of musicians, including Bob Weir and a number of other Kingfish veterans.  Kelly had left RatDog the year before, and was living in Hawaii. Kingfish did not perform live again until February 2022.

Danny DeGennaro was shot to death on December 28, 2011. Robbie Hoddinott died of liver failure on March 6, 2017, one day before his 63rd birthday.

On February 20, 2022, in Mount Holly, New Jersey, Kingfish performed their first live show since 1999, with a lineup of Michael O'Neill (guitar, vocals), Steve Shive (drums), Danny Galvano (keyboards, vocals), and Paul Baroli (bass, vocals).

Discography 
Kingfish released the following albums:
 Kingfish – 1976 (Round) U.S. #50
 Live 'n' Kickin''' – 1977 (Jet) U.S. #103
 Trident – 1978 (Jet)
 Kingfish – 1985 (Relix)
 Alive in Eighty Five – 1985 (Relix)
 Kingfish in Concert: King Biscuit Flower Hour – 1996 (King Biscuit)
 Relix's Best of Kingfish – 1997 (Relix)
 A Night in New York – 1997 (Relix)
 Sundown on the Forest – 1999 (Phoenix Rising)
 Live – 2000 (EMI–Capitol Special Markets)
 From the Front Row... Live – 2003 – DVD-Audio (Silverline)
 Greatest Hits Live – 2003 (King Biscuit)
 I Hear You Knockin''' – 2004 (Disky)

References

Bibliography
 
 
 

Rock music groups from California
Grateful Dead
Bob Weir
Musical groups established in 1973
Relix Records artists